The Commonwealth Avenue Bridge are two parallel pre-stressed concrete box girder road bridges that carry Commonwealth Avenue across Lake Burley Griffin, and connect  and  in Canberra, in the Australian Capital Territory, Australia.

History 
The current bridge is the fourth crossing over the Molonglo River. The first Commonwealth Avenue Bridge, completed 1916, was damaged in the 1922 flood. The second, using three Leychester-type trusses, was completed in 1924 and damaged in floods a year later. At that time, Molonglo River was not dammed to form Lake Burley Griffin. Building on the plan developed by Walter Burley Griffin, in 1957 William Holford proposed to the Australian Government that the Molonglo be dammed near Yarralumla and that Canberra's 'two halves' should be joined via a lake.

Construction of the Commonwealth Avenue Bridge began in March 1961 and the bridge was opened in November 1963. Concurrently, the Kings Avenue Bridge was opened in March 1962; and Scrivener Dam was completed in September 1963. Both bridges were built over a dry riverbed as Canberra was in the grip of drought. It took some time for the lake to fill; finally filled for the first time on 29 April 1964.

Description 
Designed by Maunsell and Partners and constructed by Hornibrook, the Commonwealth Avenue Bridge comprises five spans of continually pre-stressed concrete, totalling . The provide an entry and exit clover leaf layout, on the bridges southern approaches, operate structures were constructed totalling  each, in four approximately equal spans. The central piers, octagonal in shape, are carried on  diameter reinforced concrete cylinders. Each of the pre-cast concrete box girder sections are  each.

In 2019 a detailed analysis for the strengthening and widening of Commonwealth Avenue Bridge was presented in a business case for the Project. In late 2020 the Project was evaluated and accepted by Infrastructure Australia and in January 2021, the Australian Government announced funding to renew the Bridge.

That project is unrelated to the ACT Government's plan to extend Canberra light rail network from Civic to Woden.

References

Attribution

External links

 
 

Road bridges in the Australian Capital Territory
Bridges completed in 1963
1963 establishments in Australia
Concrete bridges in Australia
Buildings and structures in Canberra